The 1986 Swan Premium Open was a tennis tournament played on indoor hard courts at the Sydney Entertainment Centre in Sydney in Australia and was part of the 1986 Nabisco Grand Prix. It was the 14th edition of the tournament and ran from 13 through 19 October 1986. Second-seeded Boris Becker won the singles title.

Finals

Singles

 Boris Becker defeated  Ivan Lendl 3–6, 7–6, 6–2, 6–0
 It was Becker's 6th title of the year and the 10th of his career.

Doubles

 Boris Becker /  John Fitzgerald defeated  Peter McNamara /  Paul McNamee 6–4, 7–6
 It was Becker's 5th title of the year and the 9th of his career. It was Fitzgerald's 2nd title of the year and the 17th of his career.

References

External links
 International Tennis Federation (ITF) – tournament edition details

 
Swan Premium Open
Australian Indoor Tennis Championships
Swan
Swan Premium Open
Sports competitions in Sydney
Tennis in New South Wales